AFNORTH may refer to:

 Air Forces Northern, also known as the United States Air Force's First Air Force
 Allied Forces Northern Europe, the most northern NATO headquarters from 1952 to 1993 located at Kolsås, Norway
 Regional Command Allied Forces North Europe (RC AFNORTH), a headquarters of the NATO command structure located at Brunssum, the Netherlands, from 2000 to 2004, when it was restructured to become the Joint Force Command Brunssum
 AFNORTH International School (AIS), an international school located just outside the NATO Joint Force Command in Brunssum, the Netherlands
 AF North, the Northern section of the Anarchist Federation (Britain and Ireland)